North Indian Cold Wave (2011) is the cold snap affected across northern parts of India in the winter of 2011, killing more than 130 people. Uttar Pradesh, Punjab and Haryana were the northern states badly hit by the cooling of the air.

See also
 Cold wave
 Climate of India

References 

Cold waves in Asia
2011 cold waves
2011 disasters in India
Natural disasters in India